Wola Kiełczyńska  is a village in the administrative district of Gmina Bogoria, within Staszów County, Świętokrzyskie Voivodeship, in south-central Poland.

The village has a population of  169.

Demography 
According to the 2002 Poland census, there were 167 people residing in Wola Kiełczyńska village, of whom 51.5% were male and 48.5% were female. In the village, the population was spread out, with 19.8% under the age of 18, 34.1% from 18 to 44, 21% from 45 to 64, and 25.1% who were 65 years of age or older.
 Figure 1. Population pyramid of village in 2002 — by age group and sex

References

Villages in Staszów County